The Onkalo spent nuclear fuel repository is a deep geological repository for the final disposal of spent nuclear fuel. It is near the Olkiluoto Nuclear Power Plant in the municipality of Eurajoki, on the west coast of Finland. It is being constructed by Posiva, and is based on the KBS-3 method of nuclear waste burial developed in Sweden by Svensk Kärnbränslehantering AB (SKB). The facility is expected to be operational in 2023.

History 

After the Finnish Nuclear Energy Act was amended in 1994 to specify that all nuclear waste produced in Finland must be disposed of in Finland, Olkiluoto was selected in 2000 as the site for a long-term underground storage facility for Finland's spent nuclear fuel. The facility, named "Onkalo" (meaning "small cave" or "cavity") is being built in the granite bedrock at the Olkiluoto site, about five kilometers from the power plants. The municipality of Eurajoki issued a building permit for the facility in August 2003 and excavation began in 2004.

The site was selected after a long process, which started in 1983 with a screening of the whole Finnish territory. From 1993 until 2000, four prospective sites were examined: Romuvaara in Kuhmo, Kivetty in Äänekoski, Olkiluoto in Eurajoki and Hästholmen in Loviisa. Besides geological and environmental considerations, the opinions of local residents were also taken into account. Eurajoki and Loviisa were singled out for being the locations with the highest local support. The former also had more favorable geographic conditions, thus in 1999 Posiva proposed it to the Finnish government as the selected location. The municipality of Eurajoki confirmed its approval of the site, and the national government ratified the decision in May 2001.

Posiva started construction of the site in 2004. The Finnish government issued the company a licence for constructing the final disposal facility on 12 November 2015.   Posiva expects operations to begin in 2023.

Construction 

The facility was constructed by and will be operated by Posiva, a company owned by the two existing producers of nuclear power in Finland, Fortum and TVO. (Fennovoima, a company which was  planning its first nuclear reactor, is not a stockholder of Posiva.)

The facility's constructions plans are divided into four phases:
The characteristics of the bedrock were studied in order to adapt the layout of the repository.
 In 2012, Posiva submitted an application for a license to construct the repository. The license was granted in November 2015.
 Phase 3 (2015–17) construction of the repository
 Phase 4, the encapsulation and burial of areas filled with spent fuel, is projected to begin around 2023.

Once in operation, the disposal process will involve placing twelve fuel assemblies into a boron steel canister and enclosing it in a copper capsule.  Each capsule will then be placed in its own hole in the repository and overpacked with bentonite clay. The estimated cost of this project is about €818 million, which includes construction, encapsulation, and operating costs. The State Nuclear Waste Management Fund has approximately €1.4 billion from charges for generated electricity.

The Onkalo repository is expected to be large enough to accept canisters of spent fuel for around one hundred years. At this point, the final encapsulation and burial will take place, and the access tunnel will be backfilled and sealed.

Criticism 

In 2012, a research group at the Royal Institute of Technology in Stockholm, Sweden, published research that suggests that the copper capsules are not as corrosion-proof as the companies planning the repositories claim (see KBS-3). These claims were later refuted when SKB undertook follow-up studies, which indicated that the alleged corrosion process does not exist, and that the initial experiments were not correctly executed and/or the wrong conclusions were drawn. In 2019, another study concluded that radiation effects should not significantly damage the canisters after 100,000 years.

Treatment in media 

Danish director Michael Madsen has co-written and directed a feature-length documentary Into Eternity (2010) where the initial phase of the excavation is featured and experts interviewed. The director's special emphasis is on the semantic difficulties in meaningfully marking the depository as dangerous for people in the distant future.

American anthropologist Vincent Ialenti has written a book Deep Time Reckoning (MIT Press, 2020) that explores how Onkalo repository "safety case" experts envisioned distant future ecosystems and reflected on the limits of human knowledge. His book is based on 32 months of in-person fieldwork in Finland.

See also

 Energy in Finland
 Nuclear power in Finland
 Long-time nuclear waste warning messages

References

External links 
"Envisioning Landscapes Of Our Very Distant Future" (Vincent Ialenti) NPR Cosmos & Culture (2014).
"Pondering 'Deep Time' Could Inspire New Ways To View Climate Change" (Vincent Ialenti) NPR Cosmos & Culture (2014).
"Deep Time Reckoning" (Vincent Ialenti) The MIT Press (2020).
"Death & Succession Among Finland's Nuclear Waste Experts" (Vincent Ialenti) Physics Today, 70, 10, 48 (2017).
"Sebastian Musch: The Atomic Priesthood and Nuclear Waste Management - Religion, Sci-fi Literature and the End of our Civilization

Radioactive waste repositories
Nuclear power in Finland